Kilinchi (Nogai: Келеши) is a rural locality (a selo) and the administrative center of Kilinchinsky Selsoviet, Privolzhsky District, Astrakhan Oblast, Russia. The population was 3,137 as of 2010. There are 90 streets.

Geography 
Kilinchi is located 19 km southeast of Nachalovo (the district's administrative centre) by road. Nachalo is the nearest rural locality.

References 

Rural localities in Privolzhsky District, Astrakhan Oblast